Mirante is a municipality in the state of Bahia in Brazil. The population is 8,447 (2020 est.) in an area of 1173 km².

References

Municipalities in Bahia